The Najd Expedition was a series of military conflicts waged by Egypt on behalf of the Ottoman Empire from 1817–1818. It was part of the Ottoman–Saudi War that lasted from 1811 to 1818. The campaign of 1817/8 was led by Ibrahim Pasha, with the goal of capturing Diriyah and to end the First Saudi State by the order of the Ottoman sultan Mahmud II.

About 30,000 soldiers started from Hnakiyah to the west of Medina, having captured the village of Mawiyah in November 1817, then Al-Rass, Al-Khabra, Unaizah, and Buraidah in December 1817, they reached Dir'iyyah in April 1818. After a siege of several months, Abdullah bin Saud finally surrendered on September 9, 1818.

Then, a puppet state, the Mu'ammarid Imamate was set up by the Egyptians on the regions, but was ultimately reconquered by the Saudis a few years after.

See also

 Najd
 Hadith of Najd

References

History of Nejd
Battles of the Wahhabi War
Conflicts in 1817
Conflicts in 1818
1817 in Asia
1818 in Asia
1817 in Egypt
1818 in Egypt
Najd
Battles involving the Ottoman Empire
Battles involving Saudi Arabia